Greg Brooker is an American screenwriter, best known for co-writing the screenplay of Stuart Little with M. Night Shyamalan.

Filmography
I'm on Fire (1998) (Actor)
Stuart Little (1999) (Screenplay) 
Birthday (1999) (Director)
Nosferatu L.A. '02 (2002) (Director) 
A.W.O.L (2006) (Actor)
Joe Dick (2009) (Very Special Thanks)
Christopher Robin (2018) (Story)

References

External links

Living people
Year of birth missing (living people)
American male screenwriters